Savages is a French drama mini-series, which premiered on Canal+ in September 2019. A political drama, the series stars Roschdy Zem as Idder Chaouch, a politician who is on the verge of becoming the first Maghrebi person to win election as President of France, but whose campaign may be undone by family and racial politics after an assassination attempt is made on his life.

The series was created by Rebecca Zlotowski and Sabri Louatah, based on a series of novels by Louatah.

The series had its television premiere on September 23, 2019. In advance of its television premiere, two episodes of the series received a preview screening in the Primetime program at the 2019 Toronto International Film Festival.

Cast
 Marina Foïs : Marion
 Souheila Yacoub : Jasmine
 Roschdy Zem : Idder Chaouch
 Amira Casar : Daria
 Sofiane : Nazir
 Lyna Khoudri : Louna
 Gérard Watkins : Serge Lamiel
 Jacques Bonnaffé : Doctor Lamarche-Vadel

References

External links

2010s French television series
2019 French television series debuts
French political drama television series
Canal+ original programming